Theangela was a town of ancient Caria. Upon the conquest of Caria by Alexander the Great, he placed it under the jurisdiction of Halicarnassus. It was birthplace of Philippus of Theangela, a 4th-century BCE historian. It was a polis (city-state) and a member of the Delian League. It was in a sympoliteia with Kildara and Thodosa.
 
Its site is located near Etrim, Asiatic Turkey.

References

Populated places in ancient Caria
Former populated places in Turkey
Greek city-states
Members of the Delian League
Bodrum District
History of Muğla Province